Dorcas Gyimah (born 2 February 1992) is a Ghanaian sprinter specialising in the 100 metres and 200 metres. She represented Ghana in the 200 metres at the 2015 African Games.

Gyimah was selected to represent Ghana in the 4 × 100 metres relay at the 2016 Summer Olympics in Rio de Janeiro, Brazil. Gyimah was not selected to run in the heat and the team did not advance to the final.

Competition record

References

1992 births
Living people
Ghanaian female sprinters
Athletes (track and field) at the 2015 African Games
Konongo Odumase Senior High School alumni
African Games competitors for Ghana
20th-century Ghanaian women
21st-century Ghanaian women